Dick Berg (1944 - March 22, 2018) was a sports promoter and athlete. He promoted the NFL and the Olympics and was also quarterback at Stanford University.

Life and career 
Berg was born and raised in Puyallup, Washington.

He was a quarterback at Stanford University where he helped win their  first victory over Notre Dame University in 1963.

Berg started promoting sports while attending law school at the University of Washington and working for the Seattle Chamber of Commerce. He helped the city of Seattle with its NBA expansion and getting SuperSonics to move there. He became the team’s director of marketing.

He was the first general manager for the San Jose Earthquakes, and is said to have come up with the name Earthquakes.

He also worked for and promoted Dallas Tornado of the NASL and the Los Angeles Express of the United States Football League.

He coined the term "49er Faithful" for the 49er's fans.

Personal life 
Berg was married and divorced three times. One of his sons drowned at age of 2 in their California home pool. He had another son named Brady and daughter named Alexa.

Bibliography 

 197?, Eavesdropping America, Dick Berg, Glenn Dickey

References 

1944 births
2018 deaths
People from Puyallup, Washington
American sportspeople
Stanford University alumni

Stanford Cardinal football players